Tres Lomas Partido is a western partido of Buenos Aires Province in Argentina.

Settlements

Tres Lomas
Ingeniero Thompson

Economy

The economy of Tres Lomas is dominated by agriculture, the main crops are Sunflower, wheat and maize. There are around 150,000 head of cattle in the district and there are a number of dairy farms producing around 70,000 litres of milk per day.

External links

1907 establishments in Argentina
Partidos of Buenos Aires Province
States and territories established in 1907